David Gilreath (born December 11, 1988) is a former American football wide receiver. Gilreath played college football at the University of Wisconsin-Madison.

High school
Gilreath attended high school at Robbinsdale Armstrong in Plymouth, Minnesota after transferring from Minneapolis Washburn in Minneapolis, Minnesota where he played for three years. He lettered in football four times, baseball twice and track once.

As a senior, Gilreath caught 26 passes for 424 yards and four touchdowns, while rushing 28 times for 504 yards and two touchdowns, also returned 13 punts for 185 yards and 16 kickoffs for 358 yards and a touchdown. During his football career, Gilreath totaled 153 receptions for 2,496 yards and 45 touchdowns, along with 1,022 rushing yards. He was rated among the nation's top 75 wide receivers and the number six player in Minnesota by Rivals.com.

College career

2007
Played in 13 games at wide receiver and in the return game. Set Wisconsin records for kickoff return yards in a season (967) and in a game (189). Led the Big Ten and ranked 14th nationally with 14.0-yard punt return average (fourth-best season average in UW history). Set UW bowl game records with his season-best 60-yard kickoff return against 16th-ranked Tennessee in the 2008 Outback Bowl. Named Big Ten Special Teams Player of the Week after accumulating 148 yards on punt (73) and kickoff (75) returns in a win over The Citadel on September 15 (first Badger true freshman to earn conference player of the week honors since Ron Dayne in 1996). Named First-team Freshman All-American by Rivals.com and Scout.com. Second-team Freshman All-American and first-team Freshman All-Big Ten by The Sporting News.

2008
Played in all 13 games and started nine. Finished the season with 1,747 all-purpose yards which ranked eighth-best all-time at Wisconsin. Finished second on the team with 31 catches for 520 yards and three receiving touchdowns. Ranked sixth in the Big Ten with 134.4 all-purpose yards per game. Named Big Ten Co-Offensive Player of the Week after rushing for a career-high 168 yards and two scores on eight carries, including a 90-yard touchdown (second longest run in UW history) at Indiana on November 8. Named second-team All-Big Ten (coaches) and honorable mention Sophomore All-American by Collegefootballnews.com.

2009
Played in 13 games and started one. Finished second on the team with 984 all-purpose yards. Named Big Ten Special Teams Player of the Week after returning two kickoffs for 94 yards against Hawaii on December 5.

2010
Played in 11 games and started seven. Led the team in punt return yards, kickoff returns and kickoff return yards, second in all-purpose yards, third in receiving yards and fourth in receptions and rushing yards. Named Big Ten Special Teams Player of the Week after returning opening kickoff 97 yards (tied for fourth-longest in school history) for a touchdown in win over No. 1 ranked Ohio State on October 16; returned four kicks for 163 yards (third-highest single game total in UW history and second-highest average with 40.8 yards per return) and added one punt return for 13 yards and one reception for 18 yards. Was named team's special team MVP. Left school The Big Ten all-time leader in kick off return yards (3,025). Only player in Wisconsin history to score a receiving, rushing, punt return, and a kick return touchdown

College statistics

Professional career

Indianapolis Colts
On July 29, 2011, Gilreath was signed as an undrafted free agent by the Indianapolis Colts. On September 3, 2011, Gilreath was cut by the Colts but was re-signed to the practice squad two days later. On October 25, 2011, Gilreath was cut by the Colts.

Pittsburgh Steelers
On January 20, 2012, Gilreath was signed by the Pittsburgh Steelers. In a preseason game against the Indianapolis Colts on August 19, 2012, Gilreath caught 4 passes for 78 yards and was named Steelers Digest Player of the Week. On September 1, 2012, Gilreath was signed to the Pittsburgh Steelers Practice Squad. He was promoted to the active roster on November 12, 2012. On November 26, Gilreath was waived. Signed back to Steelers Practice Squad November 27. He was promoted to the active roster on December 31, 2012.

References

External links
 Tampa Bay Buccaneers bio
 Wisconsin Badgers bio

1988 births
Living people
Players of American football from Minneapolis
American football wide receivers
Wisconsin Badgers football players
Indianapolis Colts players
Buffalo Bills players
St. Louis Rams players
Pittsburgh Steelers players
Tampa Bay Buccaneers players
Oakland Raiders players
Seattle Seahawks players